Wang Kaiyun (1833 – 1916), courtesy name Renqiu and Renfu, was a Chinese scholar and litterateur.

Biography
Wang was born in Xiangtan, Hunan, in 1833. In 1857, he achieved the rank of Juren. When Zeng Guofan began suppressing the Taiping Rebellion, he served as a strategic adviser for him. Later, he taught at Zunjing Academy in Chengdu, Sixian Academy in Changsha, and Chuanshan Academy in Hengyang. In 1913, he was hired by Yuan Shikai as curator of the National History Museum. He also served as a member of the Senate. 

Works

References

Bibliography
 

1833 births
1916 deaths
People from Xiangtan
Politicians from Hunan
19th-century Chinese writers
Qing dynasty classicists
Chinese scholars
Chinese Confucianists
Qing dynasty essayists